Greyfriars Church is a Category A Listed building in Aberdeen, Scotland. It was designed by the architect Alexander Marshall Mackenzie and built in 1903. It is situated on Broad Street and forms the south-east corner of Marischal College, also designed by Mackenzie.

History
A priory was built in the area in 1469. Around 1525 Bishop Dunbar started a new church. This was completed and occupied in 1532 in Pre-Reformation days by Franciscan monks. It was retained for Protestant worship after the Reformation, but the monastery element was demolished to create Marischal College (attaching the church) in 1593.

In 1605, 1616 and 1640 the General Assembly of the Church of Scotland was held here (rather than its usual venue in Edinburgh).

In 1749 the church was redesignated as a chapel-of-ease to the Kirk of St Nicholas, a status which continued until 1828.

Notable Ministers
Due to the physical connection between buildings, many ministers also served concurrently as Principal of Marischal College.

Robert Barron 1624 to 1635
Thomas Blackwell 1711 to 1728
Robert Pollock 1745 to 1760
Rev Prof Alexander Gerard 1760 to 1771
Rev Dr George Campbell 1771 to 1795
William Laurence Brown
Daniel Dewar 1814 to 1819

References

Category A listed buildings in Aberdeen
Churches in Aberdeen
Listed churches in Scotland
Churches completed in 1903
1903 establishments in Scotland